Gateway High School may refer to:

United States
Gateway High School (San Francisco), San Francisco, California
Gateway High School (Colorado), Aurora, Colorado
Gateway High School (Florida),
Fort Myers, Florida
Gateway High School (Florida), Kissimmee, Florida
Gateway High School (Pennsylvania), Monroeville, Pennsylvania
Gateway STEM High School, St. Louis, Missouri
Gateway Regional High School (Massachusetts), Huntington, Massachusetts
Gateway Regional High School (New Jersey), Woodbury Heights, New Jersey

Zimbabwe
Gateway High School (Zimbabwe), Harare